Beyond the Law is a 1968 Spaghetti Western film directed by Giorgio Stegani and starring Lee Van Cleef as Cudlip, Antonio Sabàto Sr. as Ben Novack and Gordon Mitchell as Burton. It was first distributed in the United States in 1971.

Synopsis
After robbing a stagecoach, the bandit Billy Joe Cudlip (Lee Van Cleef) becomes the friend of Czech immigrant Ben Novack, an honest engineer working for the mine company of Silvertown. Cudlip is determined to "go straight", and after earning the trust of the citizens he is named the new sheriff of Silvertown. But does he really want the job, or just access to the valuable shipments of the town's silver?

Cast
 Lee Van Cleef as Billy Joe Cudlip/Billy Joe Cuddler
 Antonio Sabàto as Ben Novack
 Lionel Stander as Preacher
 Graziella Granata as Sally Davis
 Gordon Mitchell as Burton
 Bud Spencer as James Cooper
 Ann Smyrner as Betty
 Herbert Fux as Denholm
 Enzo Fiermonte as Sheriff John Ferguson
 Hans Elwenspoek as Davis
 Al Hoosman as Preacher's Associate

Release
Beyond the Law was released in Italy on 10 April 1968.

References

External links
 
 

1968 films
Spaghetti Western films
1968 Western (genre) films
Films scored by Riz Ortolani
West German films
Films shot in Almería
Films with screenplays by Warren Kiefer
1960s Italian films